Punch and Judy were a pair of dogs that received the Dickin Medal from the People's Dispensary for Sick Animals for bravery in service in Israel in 1946.  The commendation notes: "saved the lives of two British Officers... [by warning them of and] attacking an armed terrorist who was stealing upon them unawares."  Both dogs were severely wounded.

The Dickin Medal is often referred to as the animal metaphorical equivalent of the Victoria Cross.

See also
List of individual dogs Individual Dogs

References

External links
 PDSA Dickin Medal, including "Roll of Honor" PDF

Individual dogs awarded the Dickin Medal
Military animals